The Women's under-23 scratch race  at the European Track Championships was first competed at the 2002 European Track Championships in Büttgen, Germany.

Medalists

References

 Results (Cyclingarchives.com)

 
under-23 scratch
Women's scratch